Philippe Desportes or Desports (1546 – 5 October 1606) was a French poet.

Biography
Philippe Desportes was born in Chartres. While serving as secretary to the Bishop of Le Puy he visited Italy, where he learned Italian poetry. This experience became a good account. On his return to France he attached himself to the duke of Anjou, and followed him to Cracow on his election as king of Poland. Nine months in Poland satisfied the civilized Desportes, but in 1574 his patron became king of France as Henry III. He showered favours on the poet, who received, in reward for the skill with which he wrote occasional poems at the royal request, the abbey of Tiron and four other valuable benefices.

A good example of the light and dainty verse in which Desportes excelled is furnished by the well-known villanelle with the refrain "Qui premier s'en repentira", which was on the lips of Henry, duke of Guise, just before his death. Desportes was above all an imitator. He imitated Petrarch, Ariosto, Sannazaro, and still more closely the minor Italian poets, and in 1604 a number of his plagiarisms were exposed in the Rencontres des Muses de France et d'Italie. As a sonneteer he showed much grace and sweetness, and English poets borrowed freely from him.

In his old age Desportes acknowledged his ecclesiastical preferment by a translation of the Psalms remembered chiefly for the brutal mot of Malherbe: "Votre potage vaut mieux que vos psaumes." He published in 1573 an edition of his works including Diane, Les Amours d'Hippolyte, Elegies, Bergeries, Œuvres chrêtiennes, etc.

An edition of his Œuvres, by Alfred Michiels, appeared in 1858.

Tributes 

  His hometown, Chartres, pays homage to the poet by attributing to him the name of one of his ways, the rue Philippe-Desportes, which connects the street of Marshal Leclerc and that of Dr. Maunoury. Place des Halles, a stele is also erected in honor of the Chartrain poets Philipe Desportes and his nephew Mathurin Régnier.

References

External links
 
 

1546 births
1606 deaths
Writers from Chartres
French poets
16th-century French writers
16th-century male writers
17th-century French writers
17th-century French male writers
Occasional poets